Zakoby McClain (born March 7, 2000) is an American football inside linebacker for the New Orleans Breakers of the United States Football League (USFL). He played college football at Auburn.

High school career
McClain attended Valdosta High School in Valdosta, Georgia. Coming out of high school, McClain was a 4-star prospect. He was ranked the 13th best outside linebacker prospect and 24th best prospect from the state of Georgia. McClain committed to Auburn over LSU, Tennessee and many other programs.

College career
McClain played very little his freshman season. As a sophomore, McClain became a full time starter, and in the 2019 Iron Bowl 
against rival Alabama, he had a 99-yard Pick Six that helped propel the Tigers to a 48–45 upset. In his junior season, McClain led the nation in total tackles with 113. In his senior season, McClain was named to the Second-team All-SEC Team. On December 27, McClain announced he would skip Auburn's bowl game and enter the NFL Draft.

Professional career

Baltimore Ravens
McClain signed with the Baltimore Ravens after going undrafted in the 2022 NFL Draft. He was waived on August 30.

New Orleans Breakers
McClain signed with the New Orleans Breakers on January 7, 2023.

References

External links
Auburn Tigers bio

2000 births
Living people
People from Valdosta, Georgia
Players of American football from Georgia (U.S. state)
American football linebackers
Auburn Tigers football players
Baltimore Ravens players
New Orleans Breakers (2022) players